Tisedi was an ancient city and episcopal see, which remains a Latin Church titular see within the Catholic Church.

History 
Tisedi, located near modern Aziz-Ben-Tellis in present Algeria, was one of many towns in the Roman province of Numidia which was important enough to become a suffragan bishopric but faded completely.

Three of its residential bishops are recorded (although author Morcelli assigns them to Tiddi):
 Donatus I suffered gravely, according to Saint Optatus (bishop of Milevis), under the heresy Donatism and was deprived of his see in 362 by their bishop Felix of Idicra
 The Council of Carthage (484), called by Huneric of the Vandal Kingdom, was attended for Tisedi by both a Catholic bishop Lampadius, who was banished afterwards, and his Donatist counterpart, Donatus.

Titular see 
The diocese was nominally restored in 1933 as the Latin Church titular see of Tisedi (Latin)/Tisedi (Curiate Italian)/Tiseditanus (Latin adjective).

It has had the following incumbents, so far of the fitting Episcopal (lowest) rank:
 Joseph Kilasara, Holy Ghost Fathers (C.S.Sp.) (1966.11.03 – death 1978.11.21), as emeritate, formerly Bishop of Roman Catholic Diocese of Moshi (Tanzania) (1960.01.12 – 1966.11.03)
 Jorge Ardila Serrano (1980.10.27 – 1988.05.21) as Auxiliary Bishop of Archdiocese of Bogotá (Colombia) (1980.10.27 – 1988.05.21); later Bishop of Girardot (Colombia) (1988.05.21 – retired 2001.06.15), died 2010
 Luis Gutiérrez Martín, Claretians (C.M.F.) (1988.09.15 – 1995.05.12) as Auxiliary Bishop of Archdiocese of Madrid (Spain) (1988.09.15 – 1995.05.12), Bishop of Segovia (Spain) (1995.05.12 – retired 2007.11.03), died 2016
 Neil E. Willard (1995.06.27 – death 1998.03.25) as Auxiliary Bishop of Archdiocese of Montreal (Quebec, Canada) (1995.06.27 – 1998.03.25)
 Gerhard Feige (1999.07.19 – 2005.02.23) as Auxiliary Bishop of Magdeburg (Germany) (1999.07.19 – 2005.02.23), next succeeded as Bishop of Magdeburg (2005.02.23 – ...)
 Marian Rojek (2005.12.21 – 2012.06.30) as Auxiliary Bishop of Archdiocese of Przemyśl (Poland) (2005.12.21 – 2012.06.30); later Bishop of Zamość-Lubaczów (Poland) (2012.06.30 – ...)
 Gustavo Alejandro Montini (2014.02.14 – 2016.12.16) as Auxiliary Bishop of Diocese of San Roque de Presidencia Roque Sáenz Peña (Argentina) (2014.02.14 – 2016.12.16); later Bishop]] of Santo Tomé (Argentina) (2016.12.16 – ...)
 Horst Eberlein (2017.02.09 – ...), Auxiliary Bishop of Archdiocese of Hamburg (Germany), no previous prelature.

See also 
 List of Catholic dioceses in Algeria

Sources and references 
 GCatholic - data for all sections
 Bibliography 
 J. Mesnage, L'Afrique chrétienne, Paris 1912, pp. 433–434
 H. Jaubert, Anciens évêchés et ruines chrétiennes de la Numidie et de la Sitifienne, in Recueil des Notices et Mémoires de la Société archéologique de Constantine, vol. 46, 1913, p. 95

Catholic titular sees in Africa
Former Roman Catholic dioceses in Africa